The 2011 Primera División del Fútbol Profesional Chileno season (known as the 2011 Campeonato Nacional Petrobras for sponsorship reasons) was the 80th season of top-flight football in Chile. Universidad Católica was the defending champion. Universidad de Chile won both the Apertura and the Clausura Championships

Format changes
For the 2011, the ANFP's Council of Club Presidents approved the return to the Apertura and Clausura format, with playoffs.

Teams
Eighteen teams will be competing in the Primera División for the 2011 season, sixteen of whom are returning from the 2010 season. Everton and San Luis were relegated last season after finishing 17th and 18th overall, respectively. There were replaced by Iquique and Unión La Calera, the 2010 Primera B winner and runner-up, respectively.

Managerial changes
Note: this list is incomplete. You can help Wikipedia by expanding it.

Torneo Apertura

The Torneo Apertura began on January 28 and ended on June 12.

Classification stage
The Classification Stage began on January 28 and ended on May 22.

Standings

Results

Playoff stage

Quarterfinals
In the quarterfinals, the 1 seed play the 8 seed, the 2 seed play the 7 seed, the 3 seed play the 6 seed, and the 4 seed play the 5 seed.

Semifinals
In the semifinals, the highest seed play the lowest seed, and the second-highest seed play the second-lowest seed.

Final

Top goalscorers

Copa Sudamericana playoff

Torneo Clausura
The Torneo Clausura is scheduled to begin on July 29 and end on December 17.

Classification stage

Standings

Results

Playoff stage
For all ties, the lower-seeded team play the first leg at home.

Updated as of games played on December 22, 2011.

Quarterfinals
In the quarterfinals, the 1 seed play the 8 seed, the 2 seed play the 7 seed, the 3 seed play the 6 seed, and the 4 seed play the 5 seed.

Quarterfinals A

Quarterfinals B

Quarterfinals C

Quarterfinals D

Semifinals
In the semifinals, the highest seed play the lowest seed, and the second-highest seed play the second-lowest seed.

Semifinals A

Semifinals B

Final

Top goalscorers

Aggregate table

Relegation/promotion playoffs

Attendance
These are the attendance records of each of the teams.

DNQ: Did Not Qualify

References

External links
ANFP 
2011 Chilean Primera División season at Soccerway
Season regulations 

 
Primera División de Chile seasons
Chile
1